Karish Marielle Rivera de Jesus (born 23 January 2003) is a Puerto Rican footballer who plays for Caribbean Stars FC and the Puerto Rico women's national football team.

Personal life

Rivera has two sisters, Leilany and Yarielys.

References 

2003 births
Living people
Puerto Rican women's footballers
Women's association football forwards
Puerto Rico women's international footballers